The Virgin Fest, known as the Virgin Mobile FreeFest in the United States, was a rock festival held in the United States and Canada, a spin-off from the V Festival held in the UK. In North America the Virgin name, and more recently the Virgin Mobile USA brand, were used in full to increase brand association, compared with the UK and Australian festivals, where association is simply implied through the use of the letter V.

Like the other variants of the V Festival, the events were sponsored by Virgin Mobile, in this case, either the US or Canadian versions.

On June 30, 2006, Virgin Group chief Richard Branson announced the inaugural shows. The first, which took place in 2006 on September 9 and 10 at Toronto Islands Park, Toronto, Ontario, Canada, featured over 40 artists. A single-day show also took place in Baltimore, Maryland, United States, on September 23, 2006, at the Pimlico Race Course with the Red Hot Chili Peppers and the Who.

Virgin Festival 2007 took place in Vancouver on May 20 and 21, as well as a return to Pimlico Race Track in Baltimore for an expanded two-day event on August 4 and 5 and Toronto on September 8 and 9. On October 16, 2007, an event was announced to take place in Calgary, Alberta, on June 21 and 22, 2008. The festival also returned to Baltimore on August 9 and 10, 2008.

The shows in Baltimore were put on by Seth Hurwitz's I.M.P. Productions, owner and operator of the 9:30 Club in Washington, D.C., and the former producer of the HFStival.

In 2007, Richard Branson was encouraged by Daryl Hannah to green the Baltimore festival by bringing in zero waste event producers The Spitfire Agency.

The 2009 Virgin Mobile Festival, dubbed the Virgin Mobile FreeFest, was held on August 30, 2009 at the Merriweather Post Pavilion in Columbia, Maryland. The festival returned to Merriweather on Saturday, September 25, 2010, and was once again a free event. The Virgin Mobile FreeFest also returned to Merriweather Post Pavilion on September 10, 2011. The tickets were reported to have "freed out" in just over five minutes after being available. The headliners for the 2011 Virgin Mobile FreeFest were Deadmau5 (house), Cee Lo Green (hip-hop/pop), and the Black Keys (indie).

2013 lineup

Virgin Mobile FreeFest (Saturday, September 21st)

Pavilion Stage
The Knocks
Little Green Cars
Black Joe Lewis
City and Colour
MGMT
The Avett Brothers
Vampire Weekend

West Stage
Sky Ferreira
Chvrches
Icona Pop
Kaskade
Robin Thicke
Pretty Lights

Dance Forest
Ghost Beach
Washed Out
Manufactured Superstars
Congorock
TJR
Gareth Emery
Madeon

2012 lineup

Virgin Mobile FreeFest (Saturday, October 6th)

Pavilion Stage
Justin Jones
Allen Stone
Trampled by Turtles
Ben Folds Five
Alabama Shakes
ZZ Top
Jack White

West Stage
Das Racist (cancelled due to illness/breakup)
Future Islands
Portugal. The Man
The Dismemberment Plan
Santigold
NAS
M83
Skrillex

Dance Forest
Volta Bureau
Penguin Prison
Alvin Risk
Nervo
Thomas Gold
Porter Robinson & Zedd
Above & Beyond

2011 lineup

Virgin Mobile FreeFest (Saturday, September 10th)

Pavilion Stage
Bombay Bicycle Club
Okkervil River
Grace Potter & the Nocturnals
Patti Smith
TV on the Radio returning for a second time (2007)
The Black Keys returning for a second time (2008)

West Stage
Alberta Cross
Two Door Cinema Club
Big Sean
Cut Copy
Cee Lo Green returning for a second time (2006 as Gnarls Barkley)
Empire of the Sun
Deadmau5 returning for a second time (2008)

Dance Forest
Eclectic Method
Porter Robinson
Calvin Harris
!!!
James Murphy returning for a second time (2010 as LCD Soundsystem)
Teddybears
Ghostland Observatory

2010 lineup

Virgin Mobile FreeFest (September 25th)
The Virgin Mobile Freefest line-up was announced at 11AM on July 20, 2010.

Pavilion Stage
Brite Lite Brite
Jimmy Eat World
Edward Sharpe and the Magnetic Zeros
High tea toast with Jeremiah Weed
Joan Jett and the Blackhearts
Matt and Kim
Pavement
LCD Soundsystem

West Stage
The Temper Trap
Trombone Shorty
Yeasayer
Thievery Corporation
Ludacris
Bindlestiff Family Cirkus
M.I.A.
Fire show by Therm

Dance Forest
Will Eastman
Wolfgang Gartner
Neon Indian
Maximum Balloon
Chromeo
Sleigh Bells
Modeselektor
Sharam

Artist T.I. canceled his performance due to ongoing legal issues.

2009 lineup

Virgin Mobile FreeFest (August 30th)

The Virgin Mobile FreeFest was held at the Merriweather Post Pavilion in Columbia, MD. In an official statement released by Virgin Mobile, it was stated that due to the current economic conditions, admission to the festival would be free of charge for all concertgoers. The sponsor hoped that concertgoers would donate $5 to youth homelessness through its charitable initiative known as the RE*Generation. Concertgoers could also purchase special packages that came with a T-shirt, as well as tickets and the donation.

Sunday, August 30

Virgin Festival Montreal (June 19 & 20)
Friday, June 19

Saturday, June 20

Virgin Festival Nova Scotia (July 4)
The venue was the Citadel Hill concert site, adjacent to the Halifax Common.

Saturday, July 4

Tragically Hip cancelled due to family medical issues.

Virgin Festival British Columbia (July 25 & July 26)
Saturday, July 25

Sunday, July 26

Virgin Festival Alberta (August 8th & 9th)
Saturday, August 8

Sunday, August 9

Virgin Festival Ontario (August 29th & 30th)
Saturday, August 29

Virgin Mobile Stage
Ben Harper & Relentless7
The Pixies
Franz Ferdinand
Paolo Nutini
Sloan
Grizzly Bear
Lights
Mates of State

Virgin Radio Stage
Daniel Merriweather
Pitbull
Down With Webster
Thunderheist
Anjulie
Candy Coated Killahz

Boardwalk Stage
The Rural Alberta Advantage
Iglu and Hartly
The Superstitions

Sunday, August 30

Virgin Mobile Stage
Nine Inch Nails
Pet Shop Boys
Our Lady Peace
N.E.R.D.
Cold War Kids
Mutemath
Mew
Datarock
Cœur de pirate

Virgin Radio Stage
Sean Kingston
The New Cities
Melanie Fiona
Hyper Crush
Fritz Helder & The Phantoms
Trouble Andrew

Boardwalk Stage
Plants and Animals
The Von Bondies
The D'Urbervilles
Silver Starling

2008 line-up

Virgin Festival Calgary (June 21 & 22)

Saturday, June 21

Virgin Mobile Stage
Kilbourne (band)
The Fratellis
Face to Face
Corb Lund
Three Days Grace
The Flaming Lips
Stone Temple Pilots

TD Music Stage
The Fast Romantics
Michael Bernard Fitzgerald
Secret Broadcast
Carolina Liar
Crash Parallel
Hey Ocean
The Dudes
Grand Theft Bus

Sunday, June 22

Virgin Mobile Stage
Chixdiggit
Attack in Black
Constantines
Stars
City and Colour
Matthew Good
The Tragically Hip

TD Music Stage
The Summerlad
Said The Whale
The Whitsundays (band)
The Spades
Ten Second Epic
Ladyhawk
Cadence Weapon
The New Pornographers

Virgin Mobile Festival Baltimore Day 1 (August 9)

South Stage
KT Tunstall
Gogol Bordello
Lupe Fiasco
Bloc Party
The Offspring
Chuck Berry and the Silver Beats
Foo Fighters

North Stage
Cat Power
Duffy
The Swell Season
Sharon Jones & the Dap Kings
Rodrigo y Gabriela
Citizen Cope
Wilco
Jack Johnson

Dance TentJDH & Dave P
Erol Alkan
DJ Dan & Donald Glaude
Soulwax
Steve Lawler
Ferry Corsten
Underworld

Virgin Mobile Festival Baltimore Day 2 (August 10)South StageHollywood Undead
The Go! Team
Andrew Bird
She & Him
Lil Wayne
The Black Keys
Bob Dylan
Kanye WestNorth StageBlack Rebel Motorcycle Club
Shudder to Think
Paramore
Taking Back Sunday
Iggy and the Stooges
Stone Temple Pilots
Nine Inch NailsDance TentChromeo
Rabbit in the Moon
Deadmau5
Richie Hawtin
Moby (DJ set)
Armin Van Buuren

Virgin Festival Toronto Day 1 (September 6)Virgin Mobile StageFoo Fighters
Bloc Party
Against Me!
MGMT
Constantines
Tito Santana
The Airborne Toxic Event
Mark RobertsonTD Music StageThe Kooks
Wintersleep
The Fratellis
Spiritualized
Shudder to Think
The Midway State
MardeenOh Henry! StageThe Waking Eyes
Bad Flirt
Lights
Flash Lightnin
The Saint Aliva Cartel
We Are the TakeBacardi B-Live StageMSTRKRFT (special, un-announced guest)
Flosstradamus
Thunderheist
Lets Go to War
Drop the Lime
Mario J
Nasty Nav

Switch and SebastiAn were replaced by MSTRKRFT due to delayed flights.

Virgin Festival Toronto Day 2 (September 7)Virgin Mobile StageOasis
Paul Weller
Stereophonics
Silversun Pickups
The Weakerthans
Danko Jones
Spiral BeachTD Music StageThe Pigeon Detectives
Sons and Daughters
Yoav
Matt Costa
Sebastien Grainger and The Mountains
Paper LionsOh Henry! StageSecret Broadcast (band)
Shad
Rock Plaza Central
Arkells
OPOPO
Winter GlovesBacardi B-Live StageMoby (DJ set)
Deadmau5
Lee Burridge
Sydney Blu
Doman and Pettigrew
Evan G
Harmonik Rage

2007 line-up

Virgin Festival (Vancouver) Day 1

Virgin Festival (Vancouver) Day 2

Virgin Festival (Baltimore) Day 1North (Main) Stage Fountains of Wayne
 Cheap Trick
 Amy Winehouse
 Incubus
 Ben Harper and the Innocent Criminals
 Beastie Boys
 The PoliceSouth (Side) Stage Fiction Plane
 The Fratellis
 Paulo Nutini
 Peter Bjorn and John
 LCD Soundsystem
 TV on the Radio
 Modest MouseDance Tent Shout Out Out Out Out
 Miguel Migs
 Booka Shade
 Felix Da Housecat
 Danny Tenaglia
 Sasha & John Digweed
 Sander Van Doorn

Virgin Festival (Baltimore) Day 2North (Main) StageCSS
Regina Spektor
Spoon
Panic! at the Disco
Yeah Yeah Yeahs
Interpol
The Smashing PumpkinsSouth (Side) StageAiden
Matisyahu
Explosions in the Sky
Bad Brains
Wu-Tang Clan
Velvet Revolver
311Dance TentDan Deacon
Girl Talk
Dieselboy and Andy C
James Zabiela
Infected Mushroom
The Crystal Method (DJ Set), Deep Dish
M.I.A.

Virgin Festival (Toronto) Day 1Virgin Mobile Stage Björk
 Interpol
 Arctic Monkeys
 Kid Koala
 M.I.A.
 K-OS
 Paolo Nutini
 The Vincent Black ShadowFuture Shop Stage Mutemath
 Voxtrot
 Matt Costa
 Enter Shikari
 The Most Serene Republic
 The Wildbirds
 Dragonette
 Jon Levine BandBudweiser Stage Spectrum, feat. Sonic Boom, Spacemen 3 & E.A.R
 Hayley Sales
 The Reason
 Sybris
 Birds of Wales
 Clothes Make the Man (band)
 Bang Camaro
 Crowned King
 Noah's ArkweldB-Live Stage Souljazz Orchestra
 DJ Dopey
 Tommie Sunshine
 Princess Superstar
 Kevin Shiu
 Robbi K
 Eric McCabe
 Tony Pantages

Virgin Festival (Toronto) Day 2Virgin Mobile Stage Smashing Pumpkins
 The Killers
 Metric
 Stars
 Tokyo Police Club
 Jamie T
 Louis XIV
 Earl GreyhoundFuture Shop Stage Editors
 Explosions in the Sky
 Constantines
 Blonde Redhead
 The Clientele
 Biffy Clyro
 Honeycut
 Justin NozukaBudweiser Stage The Cinematics
 The Heights
 The Red Romance
 Liam and Me
 The Carps
 Museum Pieces
 Closedown (band)
 DD/MM/YYYY
 The Postage Stamps (band)B-Live Stage'
 Jelo
 Dirty Vegas
 M.A.N.D.Y.
 Tony Pantages
 Steve Porter
 Sean Miller (DJ)
 Souljazz Orchestra
 Evan G

2006 line-up

Virgin Festival (Toronto) Day 1

Virgin Festival (Toronto) Day 2

Massive Attack were originally scheduled to headline but three days before the concert, it was announced that they had to postpone the first four concerts of their North American tour, including the Virgin Festival appearance, due to delays in receiving U.S. visas. They were replaced by Broken Social Scene.

Virgin Festival (Baltimore)

See also
Olympic Island Festival

References

External links
 Virgin Festival Official Canadian site

Recurring events established in 2006
Rock festivals in the United States
F
Music festivals in Maryland
Folk festivals in Canada
Rock festivals in Canada
Free festivals
Music festivals in Vancouver
Music festivals in Toronto
Music festivals in Montreal
Music festivals in Halifax, Nova Scotia
Music festivals in Calgary